The 1993–94 Washington State Cougars men's basketball team represented Washington State University for the 1993–94 NCAA Division I men's basketball season. Led by seventh-year head coach Kelvin Sampson, the Cougars were members of the Pacific-10 Conference and played their home games on campus at Beasley Coliseum in Pullman, Washington.

There was no conference tournament this season; last played in 1990, it resumed in 2002.

For the first time in eleven years, WSU was invited to the 64-team NCAA tournament. Seeded eighth in the East region, they met ninth seed Boston College in the first round in Landover, Maryland, but lost by three points.

This was Sampson's last season in Pullman; he left in late April for Oklahoma of the Big Eight Conference. The next head coach was Kevin Eastman, who previously led UNC Wilmington.

WSU's next NCAA appearance was thirteen years away in 2007, under head coach Tony Bennett.

Postseason results

|-
!colspan=6 style=| NCAA tournament

References

External links
Sports Reference – Washington State Cougars: 1993–94 basketball season

Washington State Cougars men's basketball seasons
Washington State Cougars
Washington State
Washington State
Washington State